Mikhail Popov may refer to:
Mikhail Abramovich Popov (1753–1811), Russian businessman and politician, first mayor of Perm
Mikhail Ivanovich Popov (1742–1790), Russian writer and poet
Mikhail Grigorevich Popov (1893–1955), Russian botanist
Mikhail Yuryevich Popov (born 1985), Russian footballer
Mikhail Popov (athlete), Paralympic athlete from Russia
Mihail Popov, (born 1976) Bulgarian and French badminton player
Major General Mikhail Popov, (born 1963) Commander of the Bulgarian Land Forces